Redmond High School may refer to:

 Redmond High School (Oregon)
 Redmond High School (Washington)